John Donald Carrick (1787–1837) was a Scottish journalist and songwriter.

Life
Carrick was born in Glasgow in April 1787; his father was originally from Buchlyvie in Stirlingshire. He was placed in the office of Nicholson, a Glasgow architect, while still young, leaving about 1805 for a clerkship in a counting-house. In 1807 he ran away, and walked to London, where a Scottish tradesman gave him a trial as shopboy.

In 1809 Carrick found work with Spode & Co., potters in Staffordshire, who had warehouses in London; and he acquired sufficient knowledge of the business to return to Glasgow, 1811, and set up shop in Hutcheson Street. In 1825 prolonged litigation led to his insolvency. As agent to manufacturers he visited the Highlands, and acquired the Gaelic language.

On returning to Glasgow in 1828 Carrick was engaged as sub-editor of the Scots Times. In 1833 he accepted the editorship of the Perth Advertiser, but quarrelled with the managing committee in a year, and in February 1834 started the Kilmarnock Journal. He again fell out with the proprietors, and was attacked by paralysis of the mouth; in 1835 he returned to Glasgow, in bad health.

Carrick died 17 August 1837, aged 50.

Works
In Glasgow Carrick took to writing, producing several humorous Scotch songs, and a Life of Wallace for the young. Later he contributed articles to The Day, a Glasgow daily paper which lasted only six months; and published 1830, his extended Life of Sir William Wallace of Elderslie, 2 vols. (vols. liii. and liv. of Constable's Miscellany). In 1832 he edited and partly wrote Whistle-Binkie, or the Piper of the Party, a collection of humorous songs.

Carrick edited and contributed to the Laird of Logan a collection of Scotch tales and witticism, which appeared in 1835. From Rothesay he contributed some papers to the Scottish Monthly Magazine, and announced a new work, Tales of the Bannock Men.   He left in manuscript Logan House, or the Laird at Home, a comedy. A new edition of the Laird of Logan, accompanied by an anonymous "Biographical Sketch". came out in 1841. Whistle-Binkie appeared in numerous issues.

Notes

Attribution

External links
 

1787 births
1837 deaths
Journalists from Glasgow
Scottish songwriters